Green Army may refer to:
 Ealing Trailfinders Rugby Club
 Green Army men
 Green armies (1917–1922), armed peasant groups which fought against all governments in the Russian Civil War.
 Green Guard (1942–1943), an anarchist guerrilla group that fought in occupied Ukraine during World War II.
 Plymouth Argyle F.C.
 Yeovil Town F.C.
 Lommel United
 Blyth Spartans A.F.C.